Petra Pachlová (born 15 July 1986) is a Czech former ice dancer. With Petr Knoth, she competed in the final segment at five ISU Championships – the 2004 European Championships and four World Junior Championships.

Career 
Pachlová began learning to skate in 1991. She and her skating partner, Petr Knoth, made their ISU Junior Grand Prix (JGP) debut in 2000. They finished 23rd at the 2002 World Junior Championships in Hamar, Norway; and 13th at the 2003 World Junior Championships in Ostrava, Czech Republic.

In October 2003, Pachlová/Knoth won bronze at a JGP event in Ostrava, Czech Republic. In January, they outscored Diana Janošťáková / Jiří Procházka to win the Czech national senior title and were selected to compete at the 2004 European Championships. Making their senior international debut, they finished 19th at the European Championships, which took place the following month in Budapest, Hungary. In March, they achieved their career-best ISU Championship result, tenth, at the 2004 World Junior Championships in The Hague, Netherlands. They were coached by Natalia Vorobieva until the end of the season.

František Blaťák coached Pachlová/Knoth during the 2004–05 season. After placing fourth at a JGP event in Budapest, they took silver at their October JGP assignment in Kyiv, Ukraine. They were named first alternates for the ISU Junior Grand Prix Final. They finished second to Janošťáková/Procházka at the Czech Championships in December. In March, they finished 11th at the 2005 World Junior Championships in Kitchener, Ontario, Canada. It was their final competition together.

Programs 
(with Knoth)

Competitive highlights 
JGP: Junior Grand Prix

with Knoth

References

External links 
 

1986 births
Czech female ice dancers
Living people
Figure skaters from Brno